Gettin' with It is the seventh album by saxophonist Benny Golson featuring performances recorded in 1959 and originally released on the New Jazz label.

Reception

The contemporaneous DownBeat reviewer praised the entire band as: "certainly among the most creative and swinging men on their respective instruments". The AllMusic review calls it "one of Benny Golson's best dates as a leader because one not only gets to enjoy his always strong arrangements, but his consistently first-rate tenor sax solos. Highly recommended".

Track listing
All compositions by Benny Golson except where noted
 "Baubles, Bangles & Beads" (Alexander Borodin, George Forrest, Robert Wright) - 6:16     
 "April in Paris" (Vernon Duke, E.Y. "Yip" Harburg) - 5:07     
 "Blue Streak" - 6:55     
 "Tippin' on Thru" - 6:40     
 "Bob Hurd's Blues" - 12:18

Personnel
Benny Golson - tenor saxophone
Curtis Fuller - trombone  
Tommy Flanagan - piano
Doug Watkins - bass
Art Taylor - drums

References 

New Jazz Records albums
Benny Golson albums
1960 albums
Albums produced by Esmond Edwards
Albums recorded at Van Gelder Studio